Mid-Sha'ban ( or  laylat niṣf min šaʿbān "night on the half of Sha'ban") is a Muslim holiday observed by Shia and Sunni  Sufi Muslim communities on the eve of 15th of Sha'ban  (i.e., the night following the sunset on the 14th day) — the same night as Shab-e-barat or Laylat al-Bara’ah.

Overview
It is regarded as a night when the fortunes of individuals for the coming year are decided and when Allah may forgive sinners. In many regions, this is also a night when prayers are arranged for forgiveness from Allah for one's deceased ancestors. Additionally, Twelver Shia Muslims commemorate the birthday of Muhammad al-Mahdi on this date. Imam Ja'far al-Sadiq and Imam Muhammad al-Baqir used to perform special prayers in this night. Both Sunni and Shia Muslims recognise this night to be as the Night of Forgiveness. Muslims observe Mid-Sha'ban as a night of worship and salvation. Scholars like Imam Shafii, Imam Nawawi, Imam Ghazzali, and Imam Suyuti have declared praying acceptable on the night of mid-Shaban.

Etymology
The 14th of Sha'ban goes by several names, depending on the country in which it is observed. Most can be categorised into two general meanings:

 Mid-Sha'ban or Half of Sha'ban. Named after the day's chronological position in the eighth month of the Islamic calendar:
 Nisf(u) Sha'ban,
 Nisfu Syaaban
 Nim Sha'ban
 Sha'ban yarisi
 Bara'at Night. Bara'at is an Arabic noun which is roughly translated to English as either innocence, records, assignment, deliverance or salvation.
 Laylat al-Bara'ah
 Berat Kandili
 Shab-e Baraat (Persian/)
 Shab-e Baraat
 Barat Gejesi

Origins
The base for celebrating Mid-Sha'ban is not without dispute. Whether or not 15 Sha'ban is regarded as a special holiday, has primarily been an issue of interpreting the Quran and classifying the Hadith.

Qur'an
Although not mentioned directly in the Qur'an, two verses are sometimes ascribed to Mid-Sha‘ban:

According to Tafsir Ibn Kathir, the more correct interpretation of this blessed night been attributed to another Islamic holy night, Laylat al-Qadr, based on additional verses.

Hadith

In some hadiths of Ṣihah Sittah, this Hadith is described as the specialty of the night. Also in the other Hadith texts mention the specialty of this night. There are different standards of the hadiths and disagreements in this regard. The term "night of mid-Sha'ban", which is used in the hadeeth of the Hadith, is "Nisf Sha'ban" or "laylatun nisfi min Sha'ban (ليلةٌ نصفِ مِن شعبان)". It has been said in a Hadith,

Another Hadith says,

According to different Sahih Hadith, Muhammad used to perform fasting in this month. The fast of mid-Sha'ban was the most loved of him. He used to perform fasting in the month of Ramadan, from the first to the 15th of the month. When asked about this, he said,

Birthday of Muhammad al-Mahdi

According to Twelver Shias, Muhammad al-Mahdi, the final Shia Imām, was born on 15 Sha'ban. Shi'as celebrate Muhammad al-Mahdi's birthday on that day and perform religious acts such as prayers for the reappearance of Muhammad al-Mahdi, fasting, and worship. Iranian cities are decorated on night of Mid-Sha'ban.

Related customs
Mid-Sha'ban is celebrated in countries including India, Bangladesh, Pakistan, Sri Lanka, Lebanon, Iran, Azerbaijan, Turkey, Afghanistan, Uzbekistan, Tajikistan, Kazakhstan, Turkmenistan and Kyrgyzstan. The Salafi Arabs do not celebrate this holiday. In the Arab world the festival is celebrated by Arabs with Sufi heritage, and Shias. In Iraq, children are given candies as they walk around their neighborhoods. Sunni Muslims in Iraqi Kurdistan and Afghanistan celebrate this holiday 15 days before Ramadan. Some Muslims in Indonesia do communal zikr in mosques followed by a lecture (ceramah) led by an ustad or otherwise known in Java and Madura as a kyai. This tradition is rarely followed in Indonesia, but it is widely followed in Aceh, West Sumatra and South Kalimantan. In South Asia, Muslims make sweets (especially Halwa or Zarda) to be given to the neighbors and the poor on the evening prior to the 15th of Sha'ban. This custom of distributing Halva is also practiced in Bosnia on the 15th night of Sha'ban, as well as on three other holidays: Laylat al-Qadr, Laylat al-Mi'raj and Laylat al-Raghaib.

Gregorian dates

Although the date of Mid-Sha'ban is always the same in the Islamic calendar, the date in the Gregorian calendar falls approximately 11 days earlier each successive year, since the Islamic calendar is lunar and the Gregorian calendar is solar. Hence if date falls in the first ten days of a Gregorian calendar year, there will be a second occurrence in the last ten days of the same Gregorian calendar year.

References

External links
 Shabe-Baraat: Introduction and guidance on special prayers for the night. (Includes Salaatul Tasbih)  
 Article on Shab-e-Barat

Sha'ban
Islamic holy days
Shia days of remembrance
Islamic terminology
History of Shia Islam
Mahdism